Gordon Lester McFarlane (July 18, 1901 — March 2, 1987) was a Canadian ice hockey right winger. He played 28 games in the Pacific Coast Hockey Association with the Seattle Metropolitans in the 1923–24 season, 53 games in the Western Canada Hockey League/Western Hockey League with the Vancouver Maroons and Calgary Tigers during the 1924–25 and 1925–26 seasons, and 2 games in the National Hockey League for the Chicago Black Hawks during the 1926–27 season. The rest of his career, which lasted from 1919 to 1938, was spent in various minor leagues. He was born in Snowflake, Manitoba.

Career statistics

Regular season and playoffs

External links
 

1901 births
1987 deaths
Calgary Tigers players
Canadian expatriate ice hockey players in the United States
Canadian ice hockey right wingers
Chicago Blackhawks players
Cleveland Indians (IHL) players
Ice hockey people from Manitoba
Kitchener Flying Dutchmen players
Kitchener Millionaires players
People from Northern Region, Manitoba
Portland Buckaroos players
Seattle Metropolitans players
Springfield Indians
Vancouver Maroons players